Elvis in Concert is the live album released by RCA Records in October 1977 in conjunction with the television special of the same name which featured some of the final performances of American singer and musician Elvis Presley. Videotaped and recorded in June 1977, both the special and album were broadcast and released on October 3, (the single "My Way"/"America the Beautiful" was  released the same day) six weeks after Presley's death. The album peaked at No. 5 on the Billboard chart in late 1977. It was certified Gold and Platinum on October 14 and 3× Platinum on August 1, 2002, by the RIAA.

Background
The show was recorded over two days at concerts in Omaha on June 19 and Rapid City, South Dakota on the 21st. Longtime RCA Victor/Elvis producer Felton Jarvis produced the recordings, which were done to 4-track multitrack.   According to Elvis: The Illustrated Record by Roy Carr and Mick Farren, the shows were taped with the intent of producing a television special, but Presley's deteriorating physical condition put the project on hold. After his death, they write, it was decided to go ahead with the special as a tribute. Although both the June 19 and 21 concerts are the last official live professional ones ever recorded of Presley alive, Vernon Presley, Elvis' father, recorded a message that was broadcast at the end of the special and included on the soundtrack album, in which he erroneously states that the performance featured was his son's last appearance; in fact Elvis made five more concert appearances after the filming of the special. Elvis' last concert was in fact on Sunday, June 26, 1977, at the Market Square Arena in Indianapolis, Indiana. No professional recording of this last performance has ever been issued, but bootlegs of amateur recordings have.

Content
During the special, Presley performs a selection of his hits, along with songs not normally associated with him. Although it was a regular part of his repertoire for years, Presley requires a lyric sheet when he performs Paul Anka's "My Way" (noted for its opening lyric, "And now the end is near/And so I face the final curtain"). He appears to lose his train of thought during "Are You Lonesome Tonight?", although some have made the case that Elvis regularly played around with the words during the spoken portion of the song when performing it on stage, rather than it being a case of poor memory. Indeed, a concert recording of Presley similarly joking around during the monologue section of "Are You Lonesome Tonight?" dating from 1969 has been reissued by RCA several times (dubbed the "Laughing Version", it even made the UK charts after Presley's death), and he also poked fun at the song during his 1968 Comeback Special. Nonetheless, the documentary This is Elvis uses this performance to illustrate Presley's poor condition at the time and in the actual Elvis in Concert broadcast, the show cuts away to a fan who speaks about Elvis, obscuring the recitation.

The soundtrack album was issued as a 2-LP package, including a second disc of performances that were not included in the TV special. On May 22, 1992, the album was reissued on a single compact disc. Unfortunately, the CD barely improved on the somewhat poor sound quality of the original LP release.

Professional reviews
AllMusic gave the album a negative review, but conceded that "this album is not a standout Elvis concert. What it is, however, is a vitally important piece of Elvis lore." Their review went on to say that the record is "Elvis Presley's least effort, as well as his last."

Track listing

Disc 1
 Elvis Fans Comments (Pt. 1)/Opening Riff
 "Also Sprach Zarathustra"
 "See See Rider"
 "That's All Right"
 "Are You Lonesome Tonight?"
 "Teddy Bear"/"Don't Be Cruel"
 Elvis Fans Comments (Pt. 2)
 "You Gave Me a Mountain"
 "Jailhouse Rock"
 Elvis Fans Comments (Pt. 3)
 "How Great Thou Art"
 Elvis Fans Comments (Pt. 4)
 "I Really Don't Want To Know"
 Elvis Introduces his Father
 "Hurt"
 "Hound Dog"
 "My Way"
 "Can't Help Falling in Love"
 Closing Riff/Special Message from Elvis's Father

Disc 2
 "I Got A Woman/Amen"
 Elvis Talks
 "Love Me"
 "If You Love Me (Let Me Know)"
 "'O Sole Mio/It's Now or Never"
 "Trying to Get to You"
 "Hawaiian Wedding Song"
 "Fairytale"
 "Little Sister"
 "Early Morning Rain"
 "What'd I Say"
 "Johnny B. Goode"
 "And I Love You So"

Personnel
Elvis Presley – vocals, acoustic guitar on "That's All Right" and "Are You Lonesome Tonight"
James Burton – lead guitar
John Wilkinson – rhythm guitar
Charlie Hodge – acoustic guitar, vocals
Jerry Scheff – bass guitar
Ronnie Tutt – drums
Tony Brown – piano
Bobby Ogdin – electric piano, clavinet
The Sweet Inspirations, The Stamps Quartet, Kathy Westmoreland, Sherrill Nielsen – vocals
Joe Guercio – orchestra

Chart performance

Certifications

References

External links

Elvis Presley live albums
Albums produced by Felton Jarvis
Live albums published posthumously
1977 live albums
RCA Records live albums

et:Elvis in Concert
pt:Elvis in Concert
fi:Elvis in Concert
sv:Elvis in Concert